Chloé LaDuchesse is a Canadian poet from Sudbury, Ontario, whose collection Exosquelette was a shortlisted finalist for the Governor General's Award for French-language poetry at the 2021 Governor General's Awards, and the 2022 winner of the Trillium Book Award for French Poetry.

LaDuchesse published her first collection, Furies, in 2017, and was a Trillium nominee in 2018. She served as the poet laureate of the City of Greater Sudbury from 2018 to 2020, although her time in the position was marked by a minor controversy when the city rescinded its invitation for her to read the poem she had written for the inauguration ceremony for the new Greater Sudbury City Council following the 2018 Greater Sudbury municipal election.

References

21st-century Canadian poets
21st-century Canadian women writers
Canadian women poets
Canadian poets in French
Franco-Ontarian people
Poets Laureate of places in Canada
Writers from Greater Sudbury
Living people
Year of birth missing (living people)